The Republic of China (Taiwan) (ROC) is divided into multi-layered statutory subdivisions. Due to the complex political status of Taiwan, there is a significant difference in the de jure system set out in the original constitution and the de facto system in use today.

Constitutionally, the ROC is divided into two  and six special municipalities, with each province subdivided into cities and counties. The provincial governments were abolished in 2018. Provincial borders remained for statistical purposes.

With provinces non-functional in practice, Taiwan is divided into 22 subnational divisions each with a local government led by an elected head and a local council. Matters for which local governments are responsible or partially responsible include social services, education, urban planning, public construction, water management, environmental protection, transport and public safety. There are three types of subnational divisions: special municipalities, cities and counties. Special municipalities and cities are further divided into districts for local administration. Counties are further divided into townships and county-administered cities. These divisions have a degree of autonomy. They have government offices with elected leaders and local councils, which share responsibilities with the county.

When the ROC retreated to Taiwan in 1949, its claimed territory consisted of 35 provinces, 12 special municipalities, 1 special administrative region (Hainan) and 2 autonomous regions (Tibet and Outer Mongolia). However, since its retreat, the ROC has controlled only Taiwan Province and some islands of Fujian Province. The ROC also controls the Pratas Island and Taiping Island in the Spratly Islands, which are part of the disputed South China Sea Islands. They were placed under Kaohsiung administration after the retreat to Taiwan.

Since 1949, the government has made some changes in the area under its control. Taipei became a special municipality in 1967 and Kaohsiung in 1979. The two provincial governments were "streamlined", with their functions transferred to the central government (Fujian in 1956 and Taiwan in 1998). In 2010, New Taipei, Taichung, and Tainan were upgraded to special municipalities. And in 2014, Taoyuan County was also upgraded to Taoyuan special municipality. This brought the top-level divisions to their current state:

According to Article 4 of the Local Government Act, laws pertaining to special municipalities also apply to counties with a population exceeding 2 million. This provision does not currently apply to any county, although it previously applied to Taipei County (now New Taipei City) and Taoyuan County (now Taoyuan City).

History

Territory
After the World War II in 1945, the Republic of China (1912–1949) acquired Taiwan (Formosa) and Penghu (the Pescadores) from the Empire of Japan. After the Chinese Civil War in 1949, the ROC was reduced to mainly the island of Taiwan and some offshore islands, with the People's Republic of China (PRC) controlling the mainland. This history gives two different sources of the current Taiwanese administrative divisions on the free area of the Republic of China or Taiwan Area.
 Taiwan Province: The island of Taiwan (Formosa) and Penghu (the Pescadores): inherited from the divisions of Taiwan under the Empire of Japan.
 Fujian Province: Kinmen (Quemoy) and the Matsu Islands – inherited from the ROC's mainland divisions.
Hainan Special Administrative Region: Formerly administered by the ROC, the island was conquered in 1950 by the PRC and it became a PRC province in 1988. The entire South China Sea islands were also placed under Hainan before 1950 and the ROC still retains control over Pratas Island and part of Spratly Islands, but this authority has been transferred to the special municipality of Kaohsiung following the loss of Hainan. 
Chekiang Province: Formerly administered by the ROC, the PRC conquered most of the province in 1949. However the ROC controlled Dachen Islands until 1955.
Yunnan Province: Formerly administered by the ROC, most of the province is now controlled by the PRC since 1951 while southern parts are now administered by the Republic of the Union of Myanmar.

Changes to divisions
Since 1949, the government has made some changes in the area under its control. The two provincial governments were downscaled and much of their functions transferred to the central or county governments. Six special municipalities have been created.

Since 1949, the most controversial part of the political division system has been the existence of Taiwan Province, as its existence was part of a larger controversy over the political status of Taiwan. Since 1998, most of the duties and powers of Taiwan Provincial Government have been transferred to the central government, through amendments to the constitution. The much smaller Fukien province, Fujian Provincial Government has been downsized since 1956.

There has been some criticism of the current administrative scheme as being inefficient and not conducive to regional planning. In particular, most of the administrative cities are much smaller than the actual metropolitan areas, and there are no formal means for coordinating policy between an administrative city and its surrounding areas.

Before 2008, the likelihood of consolidation was low. Many of the cities had political demographics which were very different from their surrounding counties, making the prospect of consolidation highly politically charged. For example, while the Kuomintang argued that combining Taipei City, Taipei County, and Keelung City into a metropolitan Taipei region would allow for better regional planning, the Democratic Progressive Party argued that this was merely an excuse to eliminate the government of Taipei County, which it had at times controlled, by swamping it with votes from Taipei City and Keelung City, which tended to vote Kuomintang.

On 1 October 2007, Taipei County was upgraded to a quasi-municipality on the same level as Kaohsiung City and Taipei City. This allowed the county to have the organizational and budgetary framework of a de jure municipality, but it was still formally styled as a county. Taichung County and Tainan City lobbied the central government for similar status. Taoyuan County was also upgraded to a quasi-municipality on 1 January 2011, as its population was above 2 million on the date of elevation.

Under President Ma Ying-jeou's administration, the central government has reorganized more counties and cities. Four mergers and promotions were approved in 2009 and became effective on 25 December 2010 and one more became effective on 25 December 2014.

The summary of changes on administrative divisions are shown below.

This brought the top-level divisions of Taiwan (ROC) to its current state: 2 nominal provinces without administrative function and 6 special municipalities; and under the provinces, 13 counties and three cities.

Current system

Special municipalities, counties, and cities 

Currently there are three types and in total 22 administrative divisions are directly governed by the central government (Executive Yuan). According to the Local Government Act of Taiwan, a place with population more than 1.25 million may become a special municipality, a place with population between 0.5 and 1.25 million may become a city. Counties with population more than 2 million may grant some extra privileges in local autonomy that was designed for special municipalities.

These 22 divisions are also regulated by the Local Government Act as local self-governance bodies. Each division has its own executive called "city/county government" and own legislature called "city/county council". The city mayors, county magistrates and all legislators are elected by the people under its jurisdiction every four years. Geographically, 
 Six special municipalities, three provincial cities, and ten counties are on the main island of Taiwan

{|class=wikitable
!Special municipalities!!colspan=2|Counties!!Cities
|-
|valign=top|Kaohsiung CityNew Taipei CityTaichung CityTainan CityTaipei CityTaoyuan City
|valign=top|Changhua CountyChiayi CountyHsinchu CountyHualien CountyMiaoli County
|valign=top|Nantou CountyPingtung CountyTaitung CountyYilan CountyYunlin County
|valign=top|Chiayi CityHsinchu CityKeelung City
|}

 Penghu County administers the Penghu Islands.
 Kinmen County administers the Kinmen Islands and the Wuqiu Islands.
 Lienchiang County administers the Matsu Islands.
 Note that Kaohsiung also administers Pratas Island (Tungsha Island or Dongsha Island) and Taiping Island of the South China Sea Islands.

Townships, county-administered cities and districts

The 22 main divisions in the country are further divided into 368 subdivisions. These 368 divisions can be categorized as the following.

According to the Local Government Act, a county is divided into townships and county-administered cities. The county seat or place with population between 100,000 and 500,000 may become a county-administered city. A special municipality or a city is divided into districts.

The townships, county-administered cities in counties, and mountain indigenous district in special municipalities are also local self-governance bodies. Each division has its own executive called "township/city/district office" and own legislature called "township/city/district council". The city mayors, township/district chiefs and all legislators are elected by the people under its jurisdiction every four years. The normal districts in special municipalities and cities are governed as branches of the municipality/city government and do not hold any local self-governance power.

The mountain indigenous township and districts are created for its significant population of Taiwanese indigenous peoples, in these divisions, only Taiwanese indigenous peoples may be elected to be the township/district chiefs.

Lower-level administrative divisions

The 368 divisions are further divided into villages and neighborhoods.

The village chiefs are elected by the people under its jurisdiction every four years. The neighborhood chiefs are appointed by the village chief.

Other issues

Joint Service Centers of Executive Yuan
The central government operates five regional Joint Service Centers (JSC) outside Taipei as outposts of the government ministries in the Executive Yuan, similar to the cross-departmental mode of working in the former Government Offices in England. These regions, laid out the Comprehensive National Spatial Development Plan for Taiwan, can be considered a de facto level of government, perhaps equivalent to the English regions or the federal districts of Russia.

The divisions of northern Taiwan are not covered by any JSC, including Hsinchu (city and county), Keelung, New Taipei, Taipei, Taoyuan and Yilan. They are served directly by the headquarter of Executive Yuan in Taipei.

Romanization 

The romanization used for Taiwanese placenames above the county level is a modified form of Wade–Giles, ignoring the apostrophes and hyphens of the original, thus yielding "Taipei" instead of "T'ai-pei" and "Yilan" instead of "I-lan", for example. Some postal romanizations also exist, like "Keelung" and "Kinmen".
In 2002, the ROC adopted Tongyong Pinyin as its national standard for romanization. Most townships and county-administered cities changed their romanization to Tongyong Pinyin at that time. However, some local administrations, like Taipei and Taichung, decided to use Hanyu Pinyin. In 2009, Tongyong Pinyin was replaced by Hanyu Pinyin as the ROC government standard. Currently, most of the divisions are romanized by Hanyu Pinyin system, but some local governments still use Tongyong Pinyin, like Kaohsiung. In 2011, the ROC Ministry of the Interior restored historical romanizations for two towns, Lukang and Tamsui.

See also 
 List of administrative divisions of Taiwan
 List of administrative divisions of Fujian
 History of Taiwan
 History of the Republic of China
 Political divisions of Taiwan (1895–1945)
 Provinces of China
 History of the administrative divisions of China (1912–1949)
 Mainland China
 Free area of the Republic of China
 Indigenous Area (Taiwan)
 ISO 3166-2:TW

Notes

References

External links 

 
 

Subdivisions of Taiwan
Taiwan
Taiwan